The Sheffield & Hallamshire Junior Shield was a county cup competition organised by the Sheffield & Hallamshire County Football Association from 1959 to 1990.

The competition was organised for those clubs who felt they had little chance of winning the Sheffield & Hallamshire Junior Cup.

Finals

See also
 Sheffield & Hallamshire County Cup
 Sheffield & Hallamshire County Senior League
 Sheffield & Hallamshire Senior Cup
 Sheffield & Hallamshire Association Cup
 Sheffield & Hallamshire Junior Cup

References

Sport in Sheffield
Defunct football competitions in South Yorkshire
Recurring sporting events established in 1959
Recurring sporting events disestablished in 1990
1959 establishments in England
1990 disestablishments in England
County Cup competitions